Jay Ladner (born December 8, 1965) is an American basketball coach.  He is the head men's basketball coach of the Southern Miss Golden Eagles men's basketball team.

Playing career
Ladner played college basketball at Southern Miss where he was part of the Golden Eagles' 1987 NIT Championship team.

Coaching career
In 1992, Ladner began coaching in the high school ranks, first at St. Stanislaus HS, where he guided the team to 10 state tournament appearances from 1992–2011 before moving on to his high school alma mater Oak Grove HS. His overall high school coaching record was 511–189 Ladner would move into the junior college ranks as the head coach at Jones County Junior College where in 2014 he led the Bobcats to the NJCAA Division I National Championship, becoming the lowest seed to ever win the national championship.

In 2014, Ladner was named the head coach at Southeastern Louisiana where he guided the team to a 76–88 record and a Southland Conference regular season title and the program's first NIT appearance in 2018. On April 18, 2019 Ladner was named the head men's basketball coach at his alma mater, Southern Miss, replacing Doc Sadler.

Head coaching record

NJCAA

NCAA DI

References

External links
 Southeastern Louisiana profile

1965 births
Living people
American men's basketball coaches
American men's basketball players
Basketball coaches from Mississippi
Basketball players from Mississippi
College men's basketball head coaches in the United States
High school basketball coaches in the United States
Junior college men's basketball coaches in the United States
Southeastern Louisiana Lions basketball coaches
Southern Miss Golden Eagles basketball players